Volokonovsky District is an administrative district (raion), one of the twenty-one in Belgorod Oblast, Russia. As a municipal division, it is incorporated as Volokonovsky Municipal District. It is located in the south of the oblast. Its administrative center is the urban locality (a work settlement) of Volokonovka. As of the 2021 Census, the total population of the district was 29,276, with the population of Volokonovka accounting for 35.6% of that number.

References

Notes

Sources

Districts of Belgorod Oblast